The 2004 South Dakota Democratic presidential primary was held on June 1 in the U.S. state of South Dakota as one of the Democratic Party's statewide nomination contests ahead of the 2004 presidential election.

Results

References

South Dakota
Democratic presidential primary
2004